The 25th Annual Nickelodeon Kids' Choice Awards was held on March 31, 2012, at 8 p.m. ET in Los Angeles, California, in the United States, where the winners received an orange-colored blimp trophy. Big Help Award winner Taylor Swift received a special silver-colored blimp from First Lady Michelle Obama. The complete list of nominees for the 2012 Kids' Choice Awards was released on January 11, 2012, leading up to the release of Men in Black 3 on May 25, 2012. The event was hosted by MIB 3 star Will Smith, who with ten KCA blimps has won the most awards in previous telecasts. A record-breaking 223 million votes for favorites in 20 categories were cast during this year's voting period, up 11% over last year's votes.

The show was viewed by 6.16 million, leading all cable programs for the week ending April 1, 2012.

Presenters, performers, and stunts
The show commenced with host Will Smith jumping with a parachute from a branded blimp.

Host
 Will Smith
Zach Sang, Jeff Sutphen and Daniella Monet - Pre-show Hosts

Creepy Voice
CeeLo Green

Presenters

 Halle Berry
 Chris Colfer
 Miranda Cosgrove
 Robert Downey Jr.
 Zac Efron
 Andrew Garfield
 Jada Pinkett Smith
 Josh Hutcherson
 Jaden Smith
 Keke Palmer
 Nolan Gould
 Ariel Winter

 Heidi Klum
 Ludacris
 Jennette McCurdy
 Cody Simpson
 Sarah Hyland
 Nicki Minaj
 Michelle Obama
 Chris Rock
 Emma Stone
 Willow Smith
 Lucas Cruikshank
 Reinaldo Zavarce

Performers

 Katy Perry - "Part of Me"
 One Direction - "What Makes You Beautiful"

Pre-show
Before the ceremonies and on the "Orange Carpet", Keke Palmer and Max Schneider performed "Me and You Against the World" from their upcoming movie Rags.

Announcer
 Tom Kenny

Special appearances
 Justin Bieber
 CeeLo Green

Winners and nominees
The nominations were announced on February 16, 2012. The winners are listed below, in bold.

Movies

Television

Music

Sports

Miscellaneous

Big Help Award
Taylor Swift

International

Regional Awards

Favourite Asian Act
 Agnes Monica (Indonesia)
 Charice (The Philippines) (Winner)
 Wonder Girls (South Korea)
 Yuna (Malaysia)

Favorite Brazilian Artist
 Julie e os Fantasmas
 Manu Gavassi
 NX Zero
 Restart (Winner)

Favorite Latin Artist
 Alfonso Herrera
 Danna Paola
 Dulce María
 Isabella Castillo (Winner)

UK Categories

The UK had seven unique categories this year including Favorite UK Band, Favorite UK TV Show and more.

Events within the show

Slime stunts
Slime Wrestling Championship – The Big Show defeated The Miz

Slimed celebrities
In a pre-show promo, Smith slimed Victoria Justice, Daniel Radcliffe, and Shaun White; Will Smith engaged in a slime fight with Cameron Diaz. In a special during the show music video, Big Time Rush was slimed during the video in the audience.

During the show:

 Halle Berry – After being accused of being the "Creepy Voice", she sat down in what Will Smith called the "best seat in the house ... perfect seat". Afterwards she was slimed when a person behind her dumped a bucket of it on her.
 Chris Colfer – During the presentation of favorite TV actress, the special "Exploding Blimp" was placed in front of Chris Colfer and Heidi Klum; then the blimp went off covering the Glee star in slime; Heidi was lightly slimed.
 Heidi Klum – During the unveiling of favorite TV actress, Heidi was lightly slimed when Chris Colfer was drenched in a torrent of slime.
 Taylor Lautner – After winning a push-up contest against Will Smith, his special reward was a hose-down of green slime.
 Justin Bieber – At center stage, Will Smith asked him who "the secret celebrity who wants to be slimed," and told him "It's you!"; afterwards big jets of slime shot at the two celebrities and covered them in green goo.
 Will Smith – Even though he was slimed during a promo of the 2012 KCAs; at the end of the show, Will too was slimed while trying to hide behind Bieber.
 The Miz – At the end of the special slime championship, The Miz lost to The Big Show and was thrown over the edge of the ring and into a pool of slime.
 The Big Show – After beating The Miz, The Big Show and Jeff Sutphen had a hose-down of green slime; afterwards he slipped on the slime and fell down.
 Jeff Sutphen – After presenting The Big Show with his special KCA belt, he and The Big Show were hosed down in a torrent of green slime.
 Santino Marella - Santino was the referee and announcer for the slime championship. After The Big Show had won against The Miz, he jumped into the pool of slime that The Miz had been thrown in.

References

External links
 
 Official website (archived)
 	

Nickelodeon Kids' Choice Awards
Kids' Choice Awards
Kids' Choice
Kids' Choice Awards
2012 in Los Angeles